"V.S.O.P." is the debut commercial single by American R&B singer K. Michelle released on May 20, 2013 as the lead single from Michelle's debut studio album Rebellious Soul (2013). Written by P. Hamilton, W. Felder, A. Wansel, L. Peters, W. Jeffrey, W. Boyd, and E. Powell, the song also features background vocals from R&B/pop singer Kelly Rowland as well as Muni Long who co-wrote the song. The song samples "Very Special" by Debra Laws as well as "That's How Long" by The Chi-Lites. 

Lyrically, the song speaks of a special relationship between K. Michelle and her love interest, but parallels the relationship with drinking V.S.O.P. Brandy. The song peaked at number 89 on the US Billboard Hot 100 Singles chart and at number 27 on the Hot R&B/Hip-Hop Songs chart. The official remix features American rapper Young Jeezy while other remix versions feature Rick Ross, Jadakiss and August Alsina respectively.

Critical reception 
The song received a generally positive review from music critic Andy Kellman of AllMusic. He described the song as being part of "the best material" on the album.

Music video 
The music video for the song was released on June 29, 2013 on the BET show 106 & Park and was directed by Benny Boom. It chronicles a troubled relationship between K. Michelle and her lover. The love interest in the video is played by former teen rapper Chi-Ali.

Charts

Weekly charts

Year-end charts

References

K. Michelle songs
2013 singles
Atlantic Records singles
Warner Records singles
Music videos directed by Benny Boom
2013 songs
Songs written by Muni Long
Song recordings produced by Pop & Oak
Songs written by Pop Wansel
Songs written by Oak Felder